The Ukrainian Riding Horse or Ukrainian Saddle Horse is a modern Ukrainian breed of warmblood sport horse. Breeding began in the years after the Second World War at the stud farm of Dnipropetrovsk in central Ukraine – at that time in the USSR – and later expanded to three other state stud farms. It derives from cross-breeding of Hanoverian, Thoroughbred and Trakehner stallions with local mares or with Hungarian Furioso, Gidran Arab or Nonius mares. It incorporates the last bloodlines of the extinct Orlov-Rostopchin or Russian Saddle Horse. It was bred to compete in show jumping, three-day eventing and dressage, but is also suitable as a general riding horse.

History 

Breeding of the Ukrainian Saddle Horse began in the years after the Second World War at the stud farm of Dnipropetrovsk, in Dnipropetrovsk Oblast in central Ukraine, which at that time was part of the Soviet Union. Breeding was based principally on cross-breeding of Hanoverian, Thoroughbred and Trakehner stallions with mares of local or of Hungarian Furioso, Gidran Arab or Nonius stock, but also incorporated the last bloodlines of the extinct Orlov-Rostopchin or Russian Saddle Horse. 

There are seven lines within the breed, of which the Bespechny is closest to the extinct Orlov-Rostopchin breed.

A stud-book was begun in 1971. The breed received the official approval of the State Committee for Food and Procurement of the Council of Ministers of the USSR in 1990, not long before the break-up of the Soviet Union and the independence of Ukraine.

In 2004 there were 1393 horses registered, distributed among 5 state stud farms and 20 breeders in 13 of the oblasts of Ukraine; of these, 84 were stallions. This represented about 23% of the total purebred horse population of the country, and was slightly lower than the numbers of the Russian Trotter, the most numerous breed.

Characteristics 

The Ukrainian Riding Horse is muscular and solidly built, with high withers, a broad deep chest, a long straight back, a long sloping croup and strong legs well set on. The head is well proportioned, with a straight profile.

Use 

The Ukrainian Riding Horse has been bred to compete in show jumping, three-day eventing and dressage. It is also suitable as a general riding horse.

References 

Horse breeds
Horse breeds originating in Ukraine